Ravi may refer to:

People
 Ravi (name), including a list of people and characters with the name
 Ravi (composer) (1926–2012), Indian music director
 Ravi (Ivar Johansen) (born 1976), Norwegian musical artist
 Ravi (music director) (1926–2012), an Indian film music director
 Ravi (rapper) (born 1993), a South Korean rapper
 Ravi, an actor in the 2018 film Dhwaja

Other
 Ravi, Gavorrano, a village in the province of Grosseto, Tuscany
 Ravi River, a Himalayan river flowing through India and Pakistan
 Ravi Town, a town near Lahore, Pakistan
 An alternative name for Surya, the Sanskrit word for the Sun and the Hindu solar deity
 Ravi, a fictional state in The Ravi Lancers, a novel by John Masters

See also
 
 Rabi (disambiguation)
 Ravindra (disambiguation)